The electoral ward of Port Talbot in Neath Port Talbot county borough covers the town centre of Port Talbot and the district of Pen-y-cae.  The rest of the ward to the east consists of grassland and woodland.  The electoral ward is coterminous with the Port Talbot community boundaries.

Port Talbot is bounded by the wards of Baglan and Bryn and Cwmavon to the north; Taibach and Margam to the south; and Aberavon to the west and falls within the parliamentary constituency of Aberavon.

Local council elections

2022
The election scheduled for 5 May 2022 was delayed until 23 June in the Port Talbot ward, following the death of Independent candidate Andrew Tutton during the campaign. The two seats were eventually won by the Labour Party, re-electing Saifur Rahaman with 914 votes and Sharon Freeguard with 898 votes.

2017
It was announced that for the 2017 Local Council Elections only three nominations were received in the ward. These were the current councillors Dennis Keogh, Saifur Rahaman and Sharon Freegaurd. This meant that no election was held and the three candidates became the councillors of the Port Talbot ward without contest.

2012
In the 2012 local council elections, the electorate turnout was 34.92%.  The results were: Cllr Rahaman became Neath Port Talbot's first Asian councillor.

References

Electoral wards of Neath Port Talbot
Port Talbot